Matt Hoyt (October 13, 1975 – August 14, 2021) was an American independent director, voice actor, writer, and musician, from San Diego, California. Hoyt was best known for his music videos for the bands Pinback, The Blackheart Procession, Goblin Cock, & Paradise Boys. Hoyt was the founder of WormwoodFilms.com. Hoyt also co-owned the San Diego restaurant and bar Starlite with local music scene impresario Tim Mays and musician Steve Poltz. Hoyt is a frequent collaborator with artist Jason Sherry. Matt Hoyt and Jason Sherry have been developing Talk Talk Show, an all green green-screen absurdist television show taped in front of a live studio audience.

Career
Hoyt began directing music videos and short films after college. His work as an independent director led to work in advertising as a voice actor. He worked as the assistant literary manager at the Magic Theatre in San Francisco, CA for two seasons. As a musician, Matt played guitar and sang for the San Diego band Papillon, he was also the lead singer of Turkey Mallet. Turkey Mallet also featured guitarist Dustin Boyer. Hoyt booked and promoted live music for the all-ages concert venue The Soul Kitchen in El Cajon, California from 1994 to 1996. He promoted shows for bands such as Bikini Kill, Unwound, Three Mile Pilot, Jimmy Eat World, Blink-182, and more. In 2004, Hoyt collaborated with the band The Blackheart Procession to direct The Tropics of Love, a 70-minute visual accompaniment DVD for the band's full-length record Amore del Tropico.

Voice acting
Hoyt's voice acting career began unexpectedly, when he pretended to be a Japanese game show host to accompany sound design his friends had composed for a national advertising campaign. Subsequently, his voice-over work has appeared in several television spots, radio commercials and video games. His client list included Sony PlayStation, Toshiba, Wahoo's Fish Taco, Honey Baked Ham, as well as others.

Comedy and performance
Hoyt appeared as fictional British naturalist Alister Cranberry with the band Mr. Tube and the Flying Objects as an opening act for Stephen Malkmus and the Jicks in Solana Beach, CA in the summer of 2005. He recited fictional anecdotes from the life of Alister and sang along with the band. He was subsequently pelted with wet napkins from angry audience members. Hoyt remained in character and politely thanked the angry mob in typical British fashion.

He also portrayed the fictional radio talk-show host Devon Williams. The Devon Williams Show featured Hoyt interviewing various historical and non-historical figures in an improvisational format. As Devon, Hoyt frequently cut his guests short with music and commercials.

Film and video
Hoyt latterly developed the episodic comedy Antarctic...huh?, as well as a feature film. An early draft of Antarctic...huh? screened at the Museum of Contemporary Art San Diego as part of the Here Not There series. The soundtrack of Antarctic...huh? is a collaboration between Hoyt and several musicians including original compositions from drummer Joe Plummer. Mister Heavenly, Blackheart Procession, and Modest Mouse 
In addition to music videos, Hoyt has written and produced several short films. His short film The Escape Artist premiered on the PBS series The Short List.

Death
Hoyt died in San Diego on August 14, 2021, at the age of 45.

References

External links 

 at "http://www.antarctichuh.com"
 at "http://www.sdreader.com"
 Matt Hoyt voice actor website at "http://www.matthewhoyt.com"
 at YouTube Video – Pinback AFK

1975 births
2021 deaths
American directors
People from San Diego